ZFK equation, abbreviation for Zeldovich–Frank-Kamenetskii equation, is a reaction–diffusion equation that models premixed flame propagation. The equation is named after Yakov Zeldovich and David A. Frank-Kamenetskii who derived the equation in 1938 and is also known as the Nagumo equation. The equation is analogous to KPP equation except that is contains an exponential behaviour for the reaction term and it differs fundamentally from KPP equation with regards to the propagation velocity of the traveling wave. In non-dimensional form, the equation reads

with a typical form for  given by

In the ZFK regime, . The minimum propagation velocity  (which is usually the long time asymptotic speed) of a traveling wave in the ZFK regime  is given by

whereas in the KPP regime, it is given by

Traveling wave solution

Similar to Fisher's equation, a traveling wave solution can be found for this problem. Suppose the wave to be traveling from right to left with a constant velocity , then in the coordinate attached to the wave, i.e., the problem becomes steady. The ZFK equation reduces to

Since the equation is translationally invariant in the  direction, an additional condition, say for example , can be used to fix the location of the wave. The speed of the wave  is obtained as part of the solution, thus constituting a nonlinear eigenvalue problem.

Asymptotic solution

Since  is large, the term  will make the reaction term practically zero, however that term will be non-negligible if . Therefore, it is clear that  is negligible everywhere except in a thin layer close to the right boundary . Thus the problem is split into three regions, an inner diffusive-reactive region flanked on either side by two outer convective-diffusive regions.

Outer region
The problem for outer region is given by

This solution is also made to satisfy  (an arbitrary choice) to fix the wave location somewhere in the domain because the problem is translationally invariant in the  direction. As , the outer solution behaves like  which in turn implies 

As , the outer solution behaves like  and thus .

The transition between the derivatives is described by the inner region.

Inner region
In the inner region where , reaction term is no longer negligible. To investigate the inner layer structure, one introduces a stretched coordinate encompassing the point  because that is where  is approaching unity according to the outer solution and a stretched dependent variable according to  Substituting these variables into the governing equation and collecting only the leading order terms, we obtain

The first integral of the above equation after imposing these boundary conditions becomes

which implies . The first integral after substituting  is given by

KPP–ZFK transition

whereas in the ZFK regime, as we have seen above . As ,  approaches  thereby approaching the ZFK regime. The region between the KPP regime and the ZFK regime is called the KPP–ZFK transition zone.

The critical value depends on the reaction model, for example we obtain

Clavin–Liñán model
To predict the KPP–ZFK transition analytically, Paul Clavin and Amable Liñán proposed a simple piecewise linear model

For this model there exists a critical value  such that

See also
 Fisher's equation

References

Partial differential equations
Combustion